The New Zealand cricket team toured England in the 1990 season to play a three-match Test series against England. England won the series 1-0 with 2 matches drawn.

This series was the last for the legendary New Zealand all-rounder Sir Richard Hadlee, who retired from all forms of cricket after the tour.

One Day Internationals (ODIs)

England won the Texaco Trophy on faster run rate.

1st ODI

2nd ODI

Test series summary

First Test

Second Test

Third Test

External sources
 CricketArchive – tour itineraries

Annual reviews
 Playfair Cricket Annual 1991
 Wisden Cricketers' Almanack 1991

1990 in English cricket
1990
International cricket competitions from 1988–89 to 1991
1990 in cricket
1990 in New Zealand cricket